Soliciting to murder is a statutory offence of incitement in England and Wales and Northern Ireland and the Republic of Ireland.

In common parlance, the act of soliciting to murder may be thought of as "hiring a hitman", though the word "hiring" is used loosely, and the act requires no financial transaction to qualify as such. Merely the intent to engage another in an act of murder qualifies as soliciting.

England and Wales
This offence is created by section 4 of the Offences against the Person Act 1861 which reads:

Textual amendments

The words omitted at the beginning were repealed by sections 5(10)(a) and 65(5) of, and Schedule 13 to, the Criminal Law Act 1977.

The words omitted elsewhere were repealed by the Statute Law Revision Act 1892.

The words "imprisonment for life" were substituted for the words from "be kept" to "years", on 8 September 1977, by section 5(10)(b) of the Criminal Law Act 1977.

Case law

The following cases are relevant:
R v Fox (1870) 19 WR 109 (Ir)
R v Banks (1873) 12 Cox 393
R v Ransford (1874) 13 Cox 9, (1874) 3 LT 488, CCR
R v Most (1881) 7 QBD 244, (1881) 14 Cox 583, (1881) 45 JP 696
R v Bourtzeff (1898) 127 CCC Sess Pap 284
R v McCarthy [1903] 2 IR 146
R v Krause, 66 JP 121, 18 TLR 238
R v Antonelli and Barberi (1905) 70 JP 4
R v Shephard [1919] 2 KB 125, 14 Cr App R 26, CCA

Visiting forces

Soliciting to murder is an offence against the person for the purposes of section 3 of the Visiting Forces Act 1952.

Mode of trial

Soliciting to murder is an indictable-only offence.

Sentence

Soliciting to murder is punishable with imprisonment for life or for any shorter term.

See the Crown Prosecution Service sentencing manual.

The following cases are relevant:
R v Raw (1983) 5 Cr App R (S) 229
Houseley and Kibble [1994] 15 Cr App R (S) 155
R v Adamthwaite [1994] 15 Cr App R (S) 241
Attorney-General's Reference No 43 of 1996 (Costaine) [1997] 1 Cr App R (S) 378
R v Robinson [2003] 2 Cr App R (S) 13
R v Montague [2004] 1 Cr App R (S) 137
R v Rai [2006] 2 Cr App R (S) 13
R v Saleem, Javad and Muhid [2008] 2 Cr App R (S) 12
''R v Hills'  [2007] EWCA Crim 3152, [2008] 2 Cr App R (S) 29

Orders on conviction

As to violent offender orders, see section 98(3) of the Criminal Justice and Immigration Act 2008.

History

Initially, a person guilty of an offence under section 4 was liable on conviction to penal servitude for a term not more than ten and not less than three years or to be imprisoned for a term not exceeding two years, with or without hard labour.

From 1948 to 8 September 1977, the maximum sentence was imprisonment for a term of ten years.

Northern Ireland
This offence is created by section 4 of the Offences against the Person Act 1861. The penalty was increased by article 5(1) of the Criminal Law (Northern Ireland) Order 1977 (S.I. 1977/1249 (N.I. 16)).

Republic of Ireland
This offence is created by section 4 of the Offences against the Person Act 1861.

References

Crimes